The 1998 Women's Hockey International Challenge was a women's field hockey tournament, consisting of a series of test matches. It was held in Sydney and Adelaide, from 26 March to 5 April, 1999.

Australia won the tournament, defeating Argentina 3–2 in the final. Germany finished in third place after winning the third place match 4–3 against the United States.

Competition format
The tournament featured the national teams of Argentina, Australia, Germany and the United States. The teams competed in a double round-robin format, with each team playing each other twice. Three points were awarded for a win, one for a draw, and none for a loss.

Officials
The following umpires were appointed by the International Hockey Federation to officiate the tournament:

 Peri Buckley (AUS)
 Renée Chatas (USA)
 Ute Conen (GER)
 Laura Crespo (ARG)
 Gina Spitaleri (ITA)

Results

Preliminary round

Fixtures

Classification round

Third and fourth place

Final

Statistics

Final standings

Goalscorers

References

External links
Hockey Australia

Field hockey in Australia
Women's international field hockey competitions